Popovo (from , pop, meaning "priest", and the placename suffix -ovo, literally "the priest's village") is a town in northeastern Bulgaria, part of Targovishte Province. It is the administrative centre of the homonymous Popovo Municipality. In 2021, it had a population of 13,324 and an absolute Bulgarian majority.

The town was first mentioned in an Ottoman tax register of 1555.

Popovo Saddle in Imeon Range on Smith Island in the South Shetland Islands, Antarctica is named after Popovo.

Geography

The town is built along the length of the Popovska river (also called Popovski Lom or Kalakoch Dere) on top of two hills opposite from one another and in the valley as well. Not long ago, before the corrections to the Sofia-Varna railway line were completed, the tracks ran by the suburbs of the city. The land of the villages Gagovo, Zaraevo, Kardam, Medovina, and Palamartsa.

Prehistory, Antiquity 
There are three prehistoric mounds of the Eneolithic and Chalcolithic settlements in the Popovo area, one northwest of the city and those in Nevsky and Seyachi neighbourhoods, as well as nine Thracian tombstones from the Roman epoch. Tombstone mounds are divided into two mound necropolises, but most of them were already destroyed by illegal "treasure hunters".

The nearby Roman fort at Kovachevsko kale is notable for its size and remaining walls.

Twin cities
 Arzamas, Nizhny Novgorod Oblast, Russia
 Câmpulung, Romania
 Lüleburgaz, Turkey
 Negotino, North Macedonia
 Zaraysk, Moscow Oblast, Russia

References

External links
Official website

Gallery

Towns in Bulgaria
Populated places in Targovishte Province